Orinoeme maxima is a species of beetle in the family Cerambycidae. It was described by Heller in 1914.

References

M
Beetles described in 1914